The 2019 Fred Page Cup was the 25th Canadian eastern junior A ice hockey championship for the Canadian Junior Hockey League. The Amherst Ramblers hosted for the first time in team history. The tournament was held May 1 to May 5 at Amherst Stadium in Amherst, Nova Scotia. The tournament champions qualified for the 2019 National Junior A Hockey Championship, held in Brooks, Alberta, and hosted by the Alberta Junior Hockey League's Brooks Bandits at the Centennial Regional Arena.

Teams
Amherst Ramblers (Host)
Regular Season: 36-11-1-2 (2nd in MHL South Division)
Playoffs: Lost to South Shore Lumberjacks 4-3.

Yarmouth Mariners (MHL champions)
Regular Season: 36-9-3-2 (1st in MHL South Division)
Playoffs: Defeated Truro Bearcats 4-0, Defeated South Shore Lumberjacks 4-2, Defeated Campbellton Tigers 4-0 to win the league.

Ottawa Jr. Senators (CCHL champions)
Regular Season: 43-16-3 (1st in CCHL Yzerman Division)
Playoffs: Defeated Kanata Lasers 4-1, Defeated Brockville Braves 4-0, Defeated Carleton Place Canadians 4-1 to win the league.

Princeville Titans (QJHL champions)
Regular Season:35-9-2-2 (3rd in QJHL)
Playoffs: Defeated St-Jérôme Panthers 4-2, Defeated Longueuil Collège Français 4-1, Defeated Terrebonne Cobras 4-1.

Tournament

Standings

Tie Breaker: Head-to-head, then three-way +/-.

Round-robin results

Semifinals and final

References
http://fredpagecup.cjhl.hockeytech.com/
CCHL Website
LHJAAAQ Website
MHL Website
CJHL Website

Fred Page Cup
Canadian Junior Hockey League trophies and awards